Cosmon or Cosmonium is a hypothetical form of matter where the Universe would have been in a dense form of matter as a particle named Cosmon. The idea was originally proposed by Georges Lemaître who suggested the idea of a 'primeval atom’ (L'Hypothèse de l'Atome Primitif) 1946. He illustrated the idea by imagining an object 30 times larger than the volume of the sun containing all the matter of the Universe. In his view this exploded somewhere between 20–60 billion years ago. 

The idea of a primeval “super-atom” lived on and was developed forward by Maurice Goldhaber in 1956. In his proposal there would have been a point, which had been called a Universon, that would have collapsed into a Cosmon and an Anticosmon pair. Goldhaber was wondering about why is there any matter if equal amount of matter and antimatter was formed in the beginning of the big bang. One explanation for this is the asymmetry of matter meaning that there could have been slightly more matter than antimatter, for instance 1001 matter particles to every 1000 antimatter. In Goldhabers model cosmon and anticosmon would have flown apart and therefore explaining issue without asymmetry.

In 1989 Hans Dehmelt attempted to modernize the idea of the primeval atom. In this hypothesis, Cosmonium would have been the heaviest form of matter at the beginning of the big bang.

References

Physical cosmology 
Hypothetical elementary particles